The James Sparks House is a historic house at 201 North 14th Street in Fort Smith, Arkansas.  It is a -story brick structure, with a round three-story tower at one corner, around which a wraparound porch extends.  It features Romanesque segmented-arch and round-arch windows, and chimneys with decorative corbelled tops.  The interior features high-quality woodwork original to the house's c. 1887 construction.  It was built by James M. Sparks, a prominent local businessman who was the son of an Irish immigrant.  The house was carefully restored in the 20th century.

The house was listed on the National Register of Historic Places in 1972.

See also
National Register of Historic Places listings in Sebastian County, Arkansas

References

Houses on the National Register of Historic Places in Arkansas
Romanesque Revival architecture in Arkansas
Houses completed in 1890
Houses in Fort Smith, Arkansas
National Register of Historic Places in Sebastian County, Arkansas